Ivano De Matteo (born 22 January 1966) is an Italian director, screenwriter, and actor.

Life and career 
Born in Rome, De Matteo formed as an actor in the drama laboratory "Il Mulino di Fiora", and later formed a stage company together with his romantic partner and longtime collaborator Valentina Ferlan. He made his film debut in  Pasquale Pozzessere's Verso Sud. As an actor, he had his breakout in 2008, with the role of Er Puma in the TV-series Romanzo criminale – La serie. The same year, he won the Nastro d'Argento for best actor in a short film for his performance in Giorgio Caputo's Action.

After directing a documentary film, Prigioniero di una fede, which received a special mention at the Turin Film Festival, De Matteo made his feature film directorial debut in 2002 with the comedy-drama Final Stage.

Selected filmography  
As director 
 Final Stage (2002) 
 La bella gente (2009)  
 Balancing Act (2012)  
 The Dinner (2014)
La vita possibile (2016)

As actor 
 Verso Sud (1992) 
 Close Friends (1992) 
 Maximum Velocity (V-Max) (2002)  
 Gente di Roma (2003)  
 Romanzo criminale – La serie (TV, 2008 - 2010)
 Moana (TV, 2009)

References

External links 
  

1966 births
Living people 
Italian film directors
Italian theatre directors
Italian screenwriters
Male actors from Rome
20th-century Italian people
Italian male film actors
Italian male television actors
Italian male stage actors
Nastro d'Argento winners
Italian male screenwriters